Alina Payne is an historian of art and architecture. She serves as Alexander P. Misheff Professor of History of Art and Architecture at Harvard University and the Paul  E. Geier Director of Villa I Tatti, the Harvard University Center for Italian Renaissance Studies.

Life
She graduated from McGill University, and University of Toronto.
Her work focuses on architecture in the Renaissance, baroque and modern periods. Prior to joining Harvard she taught at Oberlin College and University of Toronto.

Works
 
 From Ornament to Object. Genealogies of Architectural Modernism (Yale University Press, 2012) , 
 The Telescope and the Compass. Teofilo Gallaccini and the Dialogue between Architecture and Science in the Age of Galileo (Leo Olschki, 2012) , 
 Dalmatia and the Mediterranean : portable archaeology and the poetics of influence Leiden: Brill, [2014],

References

External links

Living people
Year of birth missing (living people)
Women art historians
McGill School of Architecture alumni
University of Toronto alumni
Oberlin College faculty
Academic staff of the University of Toronto
Harvard University faculty